Harry Robert "Rip" Heneage (July 26, 1884 – September 2, 1950) was an American football player and college athletics administrator. He began his association with Dartmouth College as a student in 1903 and played halfback for the 1906 Dartmouth football team. He later served as Dartmouth's athletic director from 1927 to 1936. He resigned in 1936 after suffering a heart attack and died in 1950 at age 66.

References

1884 births
1950 deaths
Dartmouth Big Green football players
Dartmouth Big Green athletic directors